Schrecksbach is a municipality in the Schwalm-Eder district in Hesse, Germany.

Geography

Location
Schrecksbach lies in the southern part of Schwalm-Eder on the River Schwalm, and forms the border with the Vogelsbergkreis.

Constituent communities
The following centres belong to the greater community::

History
Schrecksbach is a very old place that was mentioned in one of Charlemagne's documents as "Screggesbaha am Sualmanahafluß" as early as 782.

The community itself was first mentioned in 1223.

On 31 October 1806, Napoleon's army overran the country. Elector William I fled and was unseated. At this time, Schrecksbach was occupied by enemy (ie French) troops, suffering heavily as a result.

Politics

Municipal council

Municipal council is made up of 23 members.
CDU 4 seats
SPD 11 seats
UWG (citizens' coalition) 5 seats
FWG (citizens' coalition) 3 seats
(as of municipal elections held on 26 March 2006)

Economy and infrastructure

Transport
The community is connected to the buslines through the railway stations at Schwalmstadt-Treysa and Alsfeld.

References

External links
Schrecksbach

Schwalm-Eder-Kreis